Paracancrinos is a prehistoric genus of crustacean that lived during the Upper Cretaceous in what is now Lebanon. It contains a single species, P. libanensis, which was originally described as a species of Cancrinos in 2006, but was moved to its own genus in 2016.

References

Achelata
Crustaceans described in 2006
Fossil taxa described in 2006
Late Cretaceous crustaceans
Fossil taxa described in 2016
Late Cretaceous arthropods of Asia
Fossils of Lebanon
Cretaceous Lebanon
Cenomanian genera